Castle Dykes Henge is a Class I Neolithic henge earthwork in the Yorkshire Dales National Park in North Yorkshire, England, situated between the villages of Aysgarth and Thornton Rust.

It is reported that excavation work took place in 1908, though there is little physical evidence of this as the henge appears to be mostly intact. In 2015 the Royal Archaeological Institute awarded a research grant for a survey of the site and palaeoenvironmental sampling.

References 

Henges
Archaeological sites in North Yorkshire